The siege of Shimoda was a naval siege conducted against a coastal Hōjō fortress in Izu Province, part of Odawara Campaign.

This was concurrent with the larger Siege of Odawara (1590), and though the commanders of the besieging force were among Hideyoshi's greatest generals, they were held off by a mere 600 defenders for four months.

References

1590 in Japan
Shimoda 1590
Shimoda 1590
Conflicts in 1590